5′-Phosphoribosylformylglycinamidine (or FGAM) is a biochemical intermediate in the formation of purine nucleotides via inosine-5-monophosphate, and hence is a building block for DNA and RNA. The vitamins thiamine and cobalamin also contain fragments derived from FGAM.

The compound is biosynthesized from phosphoribosyl-N-formylglycineamide (FGAR) which is converted to an amidine by the action of phosphoribosylformylglycinamidine synthase, transferring an amino group from glutamine in a reaction that also requires ATP:
FGAR + ATP + glutamine + H2O → FGAM + ADP + glutamate + Pi
The biosynthesis pathway next converts FGAM to 5-aminoimidazole ribotide (AIR) by the action of AIR synthetase which uses ATP to activate the terminal carbonyl group to attack by the nitrogen atom at the anomeric center:
FGAM + ATP → AIR + ADP + Pi + H+

See also
 Purine metabolism

References

Organophosphates
Formamides